The Women's 100m Butterfly at the 2007 World Aquatics Championships took place on 25 March (prelims & semifinals) and the evening of 26 March (finals) at the Rod Laver Arena in Melbourne, Australia. 75 swimmers were entered in the event, of which 74 swam.

Existing records at the start of the event were:
World Record (WR): 56.61, Inge de Bruijn , 17 September 2000 in Sydney, Australia.
Championship Record (CR): 57.23, Jessicah Schipper , Montreal 2005

Results

Final

Semifinals

Preliminaries

See also
 Swimming at the 2005 World Aquatics Championships – Women's 100 metre butterfly
 Swimming at the 2008 Summer Olympics – Women's 100 metre butterfly
 Swimming at the 2009 World Aquatics Championships – Women's 100 metre butterfly

References

Women's 100m Butterfly Preliminary results from the 2007 World Championships. Published by OmegaTiming.com (official timer of the '07 Worlds); Retrieved 2009-07-11.
Women's 100m Butterfly Semifinals results from the 2007 World Championships. Published by OmegaTiming.com (official timer of the '07 Worlds); Retrieved 2009-07-11.
Women's 100m Butterfly Final results from the 2007 World Championships. Published by OmegaTiming.com (official timer of the '07 Worlds); Retrieved 2009-07-11.

Women's 100 metre butterfly
Swimming at the 2007 World Aquatics Championships
2007 in women's swimming

nl:Zwemmen op de Wereldkampioenschappen zwemmen 2009 - 100 meter vlinderslag vrouwen